Turan (also spelled Turgistan and Turestan) was a province of the Sasanian Empire located in present-day Pakistan. The province was mainly populated by Indians, and bordered Paradan in the west, Hind in the east, Sakastan in the north, and Makuran in the south. The main city and bastion of the province was Bauterna (Khuzdar/Quzdar). 

The province had been a kingdom under the Indo-Parthian king Pahares I, before submitting to the first Sasanian monarch Ardashir I in 230 AD. These events were recorded by Al-Tabari, describing the arrival of envoys from Makran and Turan to Ardeshir at Gor: 

 

Turan was then governed by the Sakanshah, the first notable one being Ardashir I's grandson, Narseh. The province is mentioned in Shapur I's inscription at the Ka'ba-ye Zartosht of 262 CE, among the many provinces of the Sasanian Empire:

The 19th-century historian Wilhelm Tomaschek suggested that the name of Turan possibly derived from the Iranian word tura(n), meaning "hostile, non-Iranian land". The name was also used in the Iranian national epic Shahnameh ("The Book of Kings") to denote the lands above Khorasan and the Oxus River, later viewed as the land of the Turks and other non-Iranians.

The region was conquered by the Rashidun Caliphate circa 650 CE, as part of the Muslim conquests of Afghanistan and the Indian subcontinent.

References

Sources
 
 
 

 

Provinces of the Sasanian Empire